Lukas Billick (born 9 February 1988) is a German footballer who plays as a defender for 1. FC Schweinfurt 05.

Honours

Würzburger Kickers
 3. Liga: Third place 2015–16 (promotion to 2. Bundesliga)
 Regionalliga Bayern: Champion 2014–15
 Bavarian Cup: Winner  2015–16

1. FC Schweinfurt 05
Regionalliga Bayern: Champion 2019–21
 Bavarian Cup: (2) Winner  2016–17,  2017–18

External links

Lukas Billick at Kicker

1988 births
Living people
German footballers
SV Wehen Wiesbaden players
SV Elversberg players
3. Liga players
Association football defenders